Elizabeth Romhild (15 October 1960, Copenhagen, Denmark) is a Bangkok-based Danish-Armenian painter, sculptor, designer.

Biography
Elizabeth Romhild was born in Denmark in the family of Armenian father and Danish mother. She spent her childhood in Iran. She went to school in England, lived in Saudi Arabia, the United States, Indonesia, in 1988 she settled in Thailand.

Elizabeth is a self-taught artist. At the age of 26 she started to paint realistic portraits, then seascapes, landscapes. The hero of Elizabeth's classic and modern works is a woman with her conscious and subconscious feelings and emotions.

Elizabeth Romhild works are in private collections in Denmark, Germany, Switzerland, Netherlands, Italy, Thailand, Indonesia, Singapore, Hong Kong, Australia and in the US.

Since 1986 she participated in various solo and group exhibitions in Indonesia, Thailand, Denmark, London, Switzerland, Singapore, Italy, United States.

Elizabeth did UTOPIA for the international Bangkok Elephant Parade, which was auctioned by Christies and her elephant got the highest bid.

Exhibitions
 Indonesia, 1986
 "Yayasan Mitra Budaya Indonesia" Jakarta. 	
 Water colour exhibition at Kalista Gallery, Jakarta 	
 "Exposisi Cat Air 86" Mitra Budaya, Jakarta.
Indonesia, 1988
 First One Woman Show in Oils at Duta Fine Arts Gallery.
Thailand, 1996
"Depth of Feelings" One Woman Show of Oils and Sketches.
Thailand, 1997
 The Grand Hyatt Erawan, Bangkok, coincided with the visit to Thailand of H.R.H. Crown Prince Frederik of Denmark.
 Sheraton Grande, Bangkok, Solo Exhibition "Women & Oranges", a new collection of mildly erotic art.
 International Visual Art Exhibition at Srinakharinwirot University, Bangkok.  	
 Collection of Oil paintings at Carpediem Gallery, Bangkok.
 Thailand, 1998
"Women Carnival" solo exhibition at Pacific City Club, Bangkok.
Group exhibition at Kuppa, Bangkok.
"Looking Back" a retrospect of all to-date work at 2 Oceans 23 Gallery, Bangkok.
 Denmark
 "Sensualitet i farver" solo exhibition at Ebeltoft Kunstforening Gallery.
 Thailand, 1999
 "Oriental Mystic", exhibition of inks at 2 Oceans 23, Bangkok.
 December Group Show at 2 Oceans 23, Bangkok.
 Denmark
Exhibition of drawings at Gallery Babette, Ebeltoft.
 Thailand, 2000
 "Women & Sensuality" solo exhibition at Pacific City Club, Bangkok.
 Denmark
 "Elizabeth's Exotic World" solo exhibition at Galerie Knud Grothe, Copenhagen.
 Thailand, 2001
 Preview solo exhibition of latest works at Pacific City Club, Bangkok.
 Denmark
 "Seduction" solo exhibition of oil paintings at Ebeltoft Kunstforening Gallery in connection with the city's 700-year celebration.
 England, 2002
 Valentine Show at Bloxham Galleries, London.
 Thailand
 "Fever" solo exhibition at H Gallery, Bangkok.
 Denmark
"Forbidden Fruit" solo exhibition at Galerie Knud Grothe, Copenhagen.
 Thailand, 2003
 "Passion Play" solo exhibition at H Gallery, Bangkok
 Switzerland, 2004
 "Impromptu" solo exhibition at Palace Hotel, Gstaad.
 Exhibition at Gallery Delio Romang, Gstaad.
 Exhibition at Gallery Delio Romang, Lugano.
 Thailand
 "Bliss" solo exhibition at H Gallery, Bangkok.
 Denmark
 Solo exhibition at Galerie Knud Grothe, Copenhagen.
 Singapore
 "Trail of the East" exhibition at Opera Gallery.
 Hong Kong, 2005
 Exhibition at Opera Gallery.
 Singapore
Exhibition at Opera Gallery.
 Thailand, 2006
 "Cynosure" solo exhibition at H Gallery, Bangkok
 Denmark
 "Temptress" solo exhibition at Galerie Knud Grothe, Copenhagen
 Denmark, 2007
 "ALLURE" solo exhibition at Galleri Soto, Aalborg
 Denmark, 2008
 "DAWN" Solo exhibition at Galerie Knud, Grothe, Copenhagen
 Denmark Solo exhibition at Ebeltoft Kunst Forening, Ebeltoft, 2009
 Denmark Solo exhibition at Fredericia Kunst Forening, Fredericia
 Denmark "Kunst For Alvor" at Paradehuset Frederiksberg, Copenhagen
 Denmark  "Elizabeth Romhild Other Spirit" solo exhibition at Gallery Clifford, Vejle
 Italy Florence Biennale Internazionale dell'arte Contemporanea, Florence, 2010
 Thailand  "Wild & Whimsical" Solo exhibition at La Lanta Gallery
 USA The affordable art fair, New York City (represented by La Lanta Gallery)
 Denmark "EROS" Solo exhibition at Galerie Knud Grothe, Copenhagen
 Thailand, 2011
 "As Eye Am"  Solo exhibition at La Lanta Gallery
 Denmark, 2012
 "Eye Catching" Solo exhibition at Galerie Knud Grothe, Copenhagen
 Thailand, 2013
 "Art in the Ninth Reign" – Group Exhibition at Bangkok Art and Culture Centre, Thailand
 "Parallel" Exhibition at La Lanta Fine Art Gallery, Bangkok
Thailand 2015
MUSE at Rooftop Farmani Gallery, Bangkok

References

External links
 Elizabeth Romhild Design
 Elizabeth Romhild's Official Page
 Living the artist's life in Bankog
 L'Officiel Thailand – MUSE "Elizabeth Romhild"
 Elizabeth Romhild
 Elizabeth Romhild's works in Pinterest
 Artinian and Elizabeth Romhild join hands for CHARITY

1960 births
Living people
Danish painters
Danish women artists
20th-century Danish women artists
20th-century Danish artists
Elizabeth Romhild